Jenny Eck is an American politician who served as a member of the Montana Legislature. She was elected to House District 79, includes the Helena, Montana area. In 2016, Eck was selected as the Montana Director of the Hillary Clinton 2016 presidential campaign.

Eck served as a Minority Whip of the House during the 2015–2016 session.

References 

1979 births
21st-century American politicians
21st-century American women politicians
Living people
Democratic Party members of the Montana House of Representatives
Smith College alumni
Women state legislators in Montana